Rhodogune or Rhodugune may refer to:
 Rhodogune (mother of Darius I), an Achaemenid queen
 Rhodogune (daughter of Xerxes I), an Achaemenid princess
 Rhodogune (daughter of Artaxerxes II), an Achaemenid princess and wife of Orontes I of Armenia
 Rhodogune of Parthia, daughter of Mithradates I and wife of Demetrios II of Syria

See also
 Persian Princess, an archaeological forgery regarding the daughter of Xerxes

Feminine given names